Joe Coupland (10 April 1920 – 14 March 1989) was a Scottish professional footballer who played as a full back.

Career
Born in Glasgow, Coupland played for Maryhill Harp, Dunfermline Athletic, Ayr United, Bradford City, Carlisle United and Greenock Morton.

References

1920 births
1989 deaths
Scottish footballers
Dunfermline Athletic F.C. players
Ayr United F.C. players
Bradford City A.F.C. players
Carlisle United F.C. players
Greenock Morton F.C. players
Maryhill Harp F.C. players
Scottish Junior Football Association players
Scottish Football League players
English Football League players
Association football fullbacks